The 96th Air Refueling Squadron was a unit of PACAF's 15th Wing at Joint Base Pearl Harbor–Hickam, Hawaii in partnership with the 203rd Air Refueling Squadron and 154th Maintenance Group of the Hawaii Air National Guard.  It was inactivated on 3 September 2015.

History

World War II
The 96th Air Refueling Squadron was constituted as the 6th Reconnaissance Squadron (Medium) on 20 November 1940 and activated on 15 January 1941 at March Field, California. Originally attached to the 41st Bombardment Group, it became assigned to it on 25 February 1942. The squadron was tasked with conducting antisubmarine patrols, from December 1941–August 1942 and from December 1942–February 1943.

It was redesignated as the 396th Bombardment Squadron (Medium) on 22 April 1942 and as the 396th Bombardment Squadron, Medium, c. 9 May 1943.  Trained with North American B-25 Mitchell medium bombers, being assigned to Seventh Air Force.  Deployed to the Central Pacific Area, from 19 January–23 September 1944, engaging in combat operations in the Gilbert Islands, then returning to Hawaii in October 1944.

Deployed to Okinawa in June 1945, flying combat bombardment missions over eastern China and Formosa.   Prepared for combat action as part of Operation Downfall, the planned invasion of the Japanese Home Islands however the Japanese Capitulation in August cancelled those plans.   Squadron demobilized on Okinawa during the fall of 1945, aircraft being sent to reclamation in the Philippines.   Personnel returned to the United States and squadron inactivated on 27 January 1946.

Cold War
Activated as 96th Air Refueling Squadron, Medium in 1953.   Based at Altus Air Force Base, Oklahoma; supported refueling operations primarily in Northeast Air Command and Alaskan Air Command areas.   Also deployed to Guam in 1956 flying KC-97F and G aircraft.   The squadron was reassigned to the 11th Bombardment Wing, on 3 December 1957. Redesignated as the 96th Air Refueling Squadron, Heavy on 8 March 1958, the squadron converted that same year to the KC-135A. The 96th ARS was discontinued on 1 October 1960.  Organized on 15 December 1960, and assigned to 11th Bombardment (later, 11th Strategic Aerospace) Wing, at Altus AFB, OK, with the KC-135A as its aircraft, it was discontinued and inactivated, on 25 June 1965 and its mission, personnel and aircraft were transferred to the 11th Air Refueling Squadron, which was transferred on paper to Altus from Dover Air Force Base, Delaware.

Modern era
Redesignated as the 96th Air Refueling Squadron, reactivated, on 1 April 1994 with KC-135Rs,
Inactivated on 31 March 2005 at Fairchild Air Force Base, Washington.  It was reactivated on 23 July 2010 at Joint Base Pearl Harbor–Hickam as part of the Total Force Integration partnership between the 15th Wing of Pacific Air Forces and 154th Wing of the Hawaii Air National Guard.  The squadron was again inactivated on 30 September 2015.

Lineage
396th Bombardment Squadron
 Constituted as the 6th Reconnaissance Squadron (Medium) on 20 November 1940
 Activated on 15 January 1941
 Redesignated 396th Bombardment Squadron (Medium) on 22 April 1942
 Redesignated 396th Bombardment Squadron, Medium c. 9 May 1943
 Inactivated on 27 January 1946
 Consolidated with the 96th Air Refueling Squadron as the 96th Air Refueling Squadron on 19 September 1985

96th Air Refueling Squadron
 Constituted as the 96th Air Refueling Squadron, Medium on 6 November 1953
 Activated on 18 November 1953
 Redesignated 96th Air Refueling Squadron, Heavy on 8 March 1958
 Discontinued on 1 October 1960
 Organized on 15 December 1960
 Discontinued and inactivated on 25 June 1965
 Redesignated 96th Air Refueling Squadron and activated on 1 April 1994
 Inactivated on 31 March 2005
 Activated on 23 July 2010
 Inactivated on 30 September 2015

Assignments
 41st Bombardment Group, attached 15 January 1941, assigned 25 February 1942 – 27 January 1946
 96th Bombardment Wing, 18 November 1953
 Attached to: Northeast Air Command, 5 October-20 November 1954, 1 August-14 September 1955, 18–31 January 1956
 Attached to: Alaskan Air Command and 303d Bomb Wing [split deployment], 25 June-9 October 1956
 Attached to: 98th Air Base Group, 10 January-7 April 1957
 11th Bombardment Wing, 3 December 1957 – 1 October 1960
 11th Bombardment Wing (later 11th Strategic Aerospace Wing), 15 December 1960 – 25 June 1965
 453d Operations Group, 1 April 1994
 92d Operations Group, 1 July 1994 – 31 March 2005
 15th Operations Group, 23 July 2010 - 30 September 2015

Stations

 March Field, California, 15 January 1941
 Davis-Monthan Field, Arizona, 16 May 1941
 Muroc Army Airfield, California, 8 December 1941
 Sacramento MAP, California, c. 11 January 1942 (operated from NAS Alameda, California, April-10 May 1942)
 A detachment of the air echelon operated from MCAS Cherry Point, North Carolina, June–August 1942
 Hammer Field, California, 24 August 1942
 Stationed temporarily at: NAS Alameda, California, 1 December 1942-February 1943
 Stationed temporarily at: Sacramento MAP, California, 17 February-29 September 1943
 Hickam Field, Hawaii, 20 October 1943
 Hawkins Field (Tarawa), Gilbert Islands, 24 December 1943

 Makin Airfield, Gilbert Islands, 20 April 1944
 Wheeler Field, Hawaii, 14 October 1944 – 20 May 1945
 Yontan Airfield, Okinawa, 7 June 1945
 Fort William McKinley, Luzon, Philippines, December 1945-27 January 1946
 Altus Air Force Base, Oklahoma, 18 November 1953 – 1 October 1960
 Deployed to Ernest Harmon Air Force Base, Newfoundland, 5 October-20 November 1954, Thule Air Force Base, Greenland, 1 August-14 September 1955 and 18–31 January 1956, Elmendorf Air Force Base, Alaska and Andersen Air Force Base, Guam [split deployment], 25 June-9 October 1956)
 Altus Air Force Base, Oklahoma, 15 December 1960 – 25 June 1965
 Fairchild Air Force Base, Washington, 1 April 1994 – 31 March 2005
 Joint Base Pearl Harbor–Hickam, Hawaii, 23 July 2010 – 30 September 2015

Aircraft
PT-17 Kaydet (1941)
B-18 Bolo (1941–1942)
LB-30 (1941–1942)
A-29 Hudson (1941–1942)
B-25 Mitchell (1942–1945)
KC-97 Stratofreighter (1954–1958)
KC-135 Stratotanker (1958–1960, 1960–1965, 1994–2005, 2010-2015

References

 Notes

 Citations

Bibliography

 
 

096
Military units and formations in Washington (state)
Military units and formations established in 1953
Units and formations of Strategic Air Command